Jonas Kazlauskas (born 21 November 1954) is a Lithuanian professional basketball coach and former player. He was most recently the head coach of the Guangdong Southern Tigers in the Chinese Basketball Association (CBA).

Playing career
Kazlauskas played for Statyba Vilnius from 1973 to 1985. He won a bronze medal in the former USSR Supreme League in 1979.

Coaching career

Clubs
Kazlauskas is considered to be one of the best coaches from Europe. In the past, he has coached Lithuania's top two pro club basketball teams, Žalgiris Kaunas (1994–2000) and Lietuvos rytas Vilnius (2001–2004). In October 2004, he became the head coach of Olympiacos Piraeus, and later moved to CSKA Moscow during the 2010–11 season.

Kazlauskas took a position with the Guangdong Southern Tigers for the latter stage of the 2012–13 Chinese Basketball Association season, serving as "executive coach" to fill the role of experienced mentor for newly appointed head coach Du Feng, and helping guide the team to their record-tying eighth title in the 2013 CBA Finals. He retained his role with Guangdong for the 2013–14 CBA season but the squad lost in the semi-finals of the 2014 CBA Playoffs.

Kazlauskas returned to the Southern Tigers as head coach for the 2017–18 CBA season, while Du was serving as head coach with the "China Blue" version of the country's national team, and led a rebuilding side to third place with 28 wins in 38 regular season games before the youthful squad were eliminated in the semi-finals of the 2018 CBA Playoffs. He handed the head coaching job back to Du after the season.

National teams
In 1997, Kazlauskas became the head coach of the Lithuanian national team with whom he won bronze medals at 2000 Summer Olympics and held that position until the end of EuroBasket 2001. In 2004, he joined the Chinese national team as the assistant coach to Del Harris, and then served as the head coach from 2005 to 2008, winning the 2005 Asian championship.

From 2009 to 2010, Kazlauskas served as the head coach of the Greek national team and guided them to bronze medals at EuroBasket 2009. In 2012, he returned to Lithuanian national team and guided them to consecutive silver medals at 2013 and 2015 EuroBasket tournaments. In 2016, Kazlauskas left the team for the second time after his 4-year contract expired after the 2016 Summer Olympics.

Coaching awards and achievements

Club
 6× LKL champion: 1995–1999, 2002
 Baltic Cup winner: 1998
 FIBA EuroCup champion: 1998
 Euroleague champion: 1999
 2× NEBL champion: 1999, 2002
 2× PBL champion: 2011, 2012
 CBA champion: 2013
 2× LKL Coach of the Year: 2002, 2013
 PBL Coach of the Year: 2012

National team
 Lithuanian national team:
 Summer Olympic Games : 2000
 2× EuroBasket : 2013, 2015
 Chinese national team:
 FIBA Asia Cup : 2005
 Asian Games : 2006
 Greek national team: 
 EuroBasket : 2009

Personal life
Kazlauskas and his wife have two daughters. He likes tennis, crosswords and computer games.

See also
 List of EuroLeague-winning head coaches

References

External links

Euroleague.net Coach Profile
Euroleague.net Interview
FIBA 2006 World Championship Profile
2010 FIBA World Championship Profile

1954 births
Living people
BC Rytas coaches
BC Statyba players
BC Žalgiris coaches
EuroLeague-winning coaches
Lithuanian expatriate basketball people in China
Lithuanian expatriate basketball people in Greece
Lithuanian expatriate basketball people in Russia
Greece national basketball team coaches
Lithuanian basketball coaches
Lithuanian men's basketball players
Lithuanian expatriate sportspeople in China
Lithuanian expatriate sportspeople in Greece
Lithuanian expatriate sportspeople in Russia
Olympiacos B.C. coaches
PBC CSKA Moscow coaches
Sportspeople from Panevėžys
Soviet men's basketball players
Shooting guards